The IIHF World Championship Division I is an annual sports event organized by the International Ice Hockey Federation. The divisional championship is played in two groups.

History
From 2001 until 2011 the two national teams that lost the relegation round at the IIHF World Championship were relegated to Division I for the following year's World Championships. At the Division I Championship, the winner of each group was promoted to the following year's IIHF World Championship, while the loser of each group was relegated to the Division II.  Beginning in 2012, the last place team from each group in the world championship is relegated to Division I A, to be replaced by first and second place in Division I A.  Sixth place in I A is relegated (now) to group I B, replaced by its winner, while sixth in I B is relegated to Division II.

The Division I World Championship was formed in 2001 from Pool B and the top four Pool C teams.  Beginning in 2012 the two groups became tiered rather than parallel.  Group A teams were the nations who either were relegated from the World Championship, or placed 2nd and 3rd in their 2011 groups.  Group B was formed from the 4th and 5th placed teams, as well as the teams promoted from Division II.  Japan qualified for group A because the IIHF council voted unanimously to allow Japan to maintain their seeded position (3rd) in their respective tournaments for 2012.

Results

Pool B

Champions (1951–2000)

Summary of participation
59 championships
Division I teams (2001–present) are ranked one through twelve, with this chart assessing gold, silver, and bronze to the nations who ranked 17th, 18th, and 19th overall.

Note 1.  The Federal Republic of Germany competed as West Germany from 1953 until 1990.
Note 2.  Czechoslovakia, Sweden, and Finland each hosted this level on one occasion each.

See also
Ice Hockey World Championships
IIHF World Championship Division II
IIHF World Championship Division III

References

External links
2010 IIHF Championship Program on iihf.com